Rait is a village in Scotland. Rait or RAIT may also refer to
Rait Castle in Scotland
Ramrao Adik Institute of Technology (RAIT) in India
RAIT Financial Trust in the United States
Rait (name)